Jean-Baptiste is a male French name, originating with Saint John the Baptist, and sometimes shortened to Baptiste. The name may refer to any of the following:

Persons 
 Charles XIV John of Sweden, born Jean-Baptiste Jules Bernadotte, was King of Sweden and King of Norway
 Charles-Jean-Baptiste Bouc, businessman and political figure in Lower Canada
 Felix-Jean-Baptiste-Joseph Nève, orientalist and philologist
 Gui-Jean-Baptiste Target, French lawyer and politician
 Hippolyte Jean-Baptiste Garneray, French painter
 Jean-Baptiste (songwriter), American music record producer, singer-songwriter
 Jean-Baptiste Alphonse Karr, French critic, journalist, and novelist
 Jean-Baptiste Bagaza, chairman of Supreme Revolutionary Council in Burundi until 1976 and president of Burundi (1976-1987)
 Jean-Baptiste Baudry, son of Guillaume Baudry, Canadian gunsmith bevear goldsmith
 Jean-Baptiste Benoît Eyriès, French geographer, author and translator
 Jean-Baptiste Bessières, duke of Istria (1768–1813), was a Marshal of France of the Napoleonic Era
 Jean-Baptiste Bethune, Belgian architect, artisan, and designer who played a pivotal role in the Belgian and Catholic Gothic Revival movement
 Jean-Baptiste Billot, French general and politician
 Jean-Baptiste Biot, French physicist, astronomer and mathematician
 Jean Baptiste Bissot, Sieur de Vincennes, Canadian career man with the colonial regular troops, son of François Byssot de la Rivière
 Jean-Baptiste Boissière, French lexicographer
 Jean-Baptiste Boisot, French scholar and abbott  
 Jean-Baptiste Bottex, Haitian painter
 Jean-Baptiste Boussingault, French chemist
 Jean-Baptiste-Camille Corot, French landscape painter and printmaker in etching
 Jean-Baptiste Carpeaux, French sculptor and painter
 Jean-Baptiste Chaigneau, French Navy soldier and adventurer who played an important role in the Vietnam War
 Jean Baptiste Charbonneau, son of Sacagawea and her French-Canadian husband Toussaint Charbonneau
 Jean-Baptiste Charcot, French scientist, medical doctor and polar scientist
 Jean-Baptiste-Charles-Joseph Bélanger, French applied mathematician who worked in the areas of hydraulics and hydrodynamics
 Jean-Baptiste Clamence, Fictional character from Albert Camus's The Fall
 Jean-Baptiste-Claude Odiot, French silversmith working in a neoclassical style
 Jean-Baptiste Cléry, (1759–1809), the personal valet to King Louis XVI
 Jean-Baptiste Colbert, French minister of finance from 1665 to 1683 under the rule of King Louis XIV
 Jean-Baptiste Colbert, Marquis de Seignelay, French politician
 Jean-Baptiste Colbert, Marquess of Torcy, French diplomat, who negotiated some most important treaties towards end of reign of Louis XIV
 Jean-Baptiste Couillard Dupuis, farmer, merchant, and political figure in Quebec
 Jean-Baptiste de La Croix de Chevrières de Saint-Vallier, appointed to the see of Quebec as bishop by Louis XIV
 Jean-Baptiste de La Salle, French priest, educational reformer, and saint in the Roman Catholic Church
 Jean-Baptiste de Nompère de Champagny, 1st Duc de Cadore, French admiral and politician
 Jean-Baptiste de Voglie, eminent Italian road and bridge engineer
 Jean-Baptiste Denys, French physician notable for having performed the first fully documented human blood transfusion
 Jean-Baptiste Dominique Rusca, medical doctor who advocated the cause of the French Revolution
 Jean-Baptiste Donatien de Vimeur, comte de Rochambeau
 Jean-Baptiste Du Tertre, French blackfriar and botanist
 Jean-Baptiste Dumas, French chemist, best known for his works on organic analysis and synthesis
 Jean-Baptiste-Édouard Gélineau, French physician who first described narcolepsy
 Jean-Baptiste Ferré, miller and political figure in Lower Canada
 Jean-Baptiste Joseph Fourier, French mathematician and physicist most commonly known for the Fourier Series, law, and transform.
 Jean-Baptiste Forqueray, son of Antoine Forqueray, player of the viol and a composer
 Jean-Baptiste François des Marets, marquis de Maillebois, Marshal of France
 Jean-Baptiste Girard (pedagogue) (1765–1850), Swiss Franciscan educator
 Jean-Baptiste Girard (soldier) (1775–1815), French soldier of the Napoleonic Wars
  (1680–1733), a priest tried for witchcraft, abuse, and corruption of Catherine Cadière
 Jean-Baptiste Giraud, French sculptor
 Jean-Baptiste Guégan, French singer
 Jean-Baptiste Godart, French entomologist
 Jean-Baptiste Grange, French alpine skier
 Jean-Baptiste Grenouille, protagonist of the 1985 novel Perfume by German writer Patrick Süskind
 Jean-Baptiste Greuze, French painter
 Jean-Baptiste Guimet, French industrial chemist
 Jean-Baptiste Guth, French portrait artist 
 Jean-Baptiste-Henri Deshays, French painter of religious and mythological subjects
 Jean-Baptiste Henri Lacordaire, French ecclesiastic, preacher, journalist, and political activist
 Jean-Baptiste Janssens, twenty-seventh Superior General of the Society of Jesus (Jesuits)
 Jean-Baptiste Joseph Fourier, French mathematician and physicist best known for initiating the investigation of Fourier series
 Jean-Baptiste Jourdan (1762–1833), Marshal of France
 Jean-Baptiste Kléber, French general during the French Revolutionary Wars
 Jean-Baptiste Lamarck, French naturalist
 Jean-Baptiste Lamy, French Catholic clergyman and first Archbishop of Santa Fe, New Mexico, United States of America
 Jean-Baptiste Landé (died 1748), founder of the Mariinsky Ballet based in Saint Petersburg, Russia
 Jean-Baptiste Le Moyne, Sieur de Bienville, colonizer and repeated governor of French Louisiana
 Jean-Baptiste Lepère, French architect
 Jean Baptiste Loeillet of Ghent, Belgian composer
 Jean-Baptiste Loeillet of London, Flemish baroque composer and performer on the recorder, flute, oboe, and harpsichord
 Jean-Baptiste-Louis Franquelin, cartographer, a royal hydrographer, and a teacher of navigation
 Jean-Baptiste-Louis Gresset, French poet and dramatist, best known for his poem "Vert-Vert"
 Jean-Baptiste Lully, Italian-born French composer
 Jean-Baptiste Antoine Marcellin Marbot, French general during the Napoleonic Wars
 Jean-Baptiste Maunier (born 1990), French child actor
 Jean-Baptiste Massillon, French churchman and preacher
 Jean-Baptiste Meilleur, doctor, educator and political figure in Lower Canada
 Jean-Baptiste Michonis, personality of the French Revolution
 Jean-Baptiste Mondino, French fashion photographer and music video director
 Jean-Baptiste Morin (mathematician), French mathematician, astrologer, and astronomer
 Jean-Baptiste Morin (composer), French composer
 Jean-Baptiste Ngo Dinh Diem, South Vietnamese president
 Jean-Baptiste Nolin, French cartographer and engraver
 Jean-Baptiste Oudry, French Rococo painter, engraver, and tapestry designer
 Jean-Baptiste Ouédraogo, President of Upper Volta (now Burkina Faso) from 8 November 1982 to 4 August 1983
 Jean-Baptiste Pastré (1804-1877), a French banker and arms-dealer.
 Jean-Baptiste Peyras-Loustalet, French rugby union player
 Jean-Baptiste Pigalle, French sculptor
 Jean-Baptiste Pitois, French writer on the occult
 Jean Baptiste Point du Sable, first settler in Chicago
 Jean-Baptiste Poquelin (1622–1673), known by his stage name Molière, Classical French playwright, actor and stage manager
 Jean-Baptiste Raymond, seigneur, businessman, and political figure in Lower Canada
 Jean-Baptiste Régis, French Jesuit missionary in imperial China
 Jean-Baptiste Regnault, French painter
 Jean-Baptiste Renaud, prominent businessman, merchant, and land owner in Quebec
 Jean-Baptiste-René Hertel de Rouville, seigneur and political figure in Lower Canada
 Jean-Baptiste Robert Lindet, French politician of the Revolutionary period
 Jean-Baptiste Rousseau, French poet
 Jean-Baptiste Salpointe, first Bishop of Arizona and the second Archbishop of Santa Fe, New Mexico
 Jean-Baptiste Sanson de Pongerville, French a man of letters and poet
 Jean-Baptiste Say, French economist and businessman
 Jean-Baptiste-Siméon Chardin, French painter
 Jean-Baptiste Singelée, Belgian classical composer and violinist
 Jean-Baptiste Tavernier, French traveler and pioneer of trade with India
 Jean-Baptiste Vaquette de Gribeauval, French artillery officer and engineer
 Jean Baptiste Vermay, French-born Cuban artist and educator
 Jean-Baptiste Vuillaume, French luthier
 Jean Baptiste Wilkie (1803-1886), former chief of the Métis tribe near Pembina, North Dakota
 Jean-Pierre-André Amar, also known as Jean-Baptiste-André Amar, French political figure of the Revolution
 Joseph-Jean-Baptiste Gosselin, merchant and political figure in Quebec
 P. Jean-Baptiste Bradel, French draughtsman and engraver
 Phạm Minh Mẫn, short for Jean-Baptiste Phạm Minh Mẫn (Vietnamese: Gioan Baotixia Phạm Minh Mẫn), Catholic cardinal priest and archbishop of Ho Chi Minh City

Surnames 
 Henry Jean-Baptiste, French politician born in Martinique, MP for Mayotte
 Lucien Jean-Baptiste, French actor and film director born in Martinique
 Marianne Jean-Baptiste, British actress and singer of Antiguan and Saint Lucian heritage

Fictional persons 
 Jean-Baptiste Emanuel Zorg, a character in the film The Fifth Element
 Jean-Baptiste Augustine, a character in the videogame Overwatch

See also 
 Baptiste (disambiguation)
 Batiste (disambiguation)
 João Batista (disambiguation)
 Juan Bautista (disambiguation)
 Saint-Jean-Baptiste (disambiguation)